Globulina may refer to:
 Globulina (foram), a foraminifer genus
 Globulina (fungus), a Dothideomycetes incertae sedis fungus genus